Kaptumo is a settlement in Kenya's Rift Valley Province in Nandi County.

References 

Populated places in Nandi County